Clavosurcula is a genus of sea snails, marine gastropod mollusks in the family Cochlespiridae.

Species
Species within the genus Clavosurcula include:
 Clavosurcula schepmani Sysoev, 1997
 Clavosurcula sibogae Schepman, 1913

References

External links